Rolf Jacob Sartorius (born October 2, 2002) is an American singer and internet personality who rose to fame via social media after posting lip-syncing videos on Musical.ly. In 2016, he released his debut single "Sweatshirt", which charted on the Hot 100  in the United States and in Canada.

Early life 
Sartorius was born in Tulsa, Oklahoma. Shortly after his birth, he was adopted and moved to Virginia because his birth parents were unable to take care of him. He was raised in Reston, Virginia by his adoptive parents. At age seven, he began acting in musicals, where he discovered his love for performing.

His lip-syncing videos on Vine acquired more than 8 million followers as of August 2016 before its closure in 2017. He believed social media offered him an escape from bullying, stating, "Before Musical.ly, I wasn't the most outgoing. The app helped me goof off. It's like no one is watching besides the camera."

In 2018, Sartorius was in a relationship with Millie Bobby Brown.

Career 
Sartorius' debut single "Sweatshirt" was released on May 3, 2016, and peaked at No. 90 on the US Billboard Hot 100.

In 2016, he undertook the All My Friends Tour, a solo mini-tour where he performed in six cities. Three months later, he announced The Last Text World Tour, where he would perform in seven countries in 2017 in support of his debut extended play The Last Text, which was released on January 20, 2017. In March 2018, he attended the Los Angeles March for Our Lives protest and spoke at the event. After the tour, he released two more singles, "Hit or Miss" and "All My Friends". With "Hit or Miss" debuting at No. 72 in the United States, it is his highest-charting single to date.

In 2016, Google announced he was the ninth-most-searched musical artist of the year. On November 1, 2018, Sartorius released his EP Better with You.

Jacob Sartorius has since amassed over 23.8 million followers on TikTok.

Controversies 
In 2016, Mashable reported that an anonymous user by the name of "aly" on Twitter said that Sartorius forced her to send nude photos of herself through Facebook direct messages, sharing screenshots of the conversation as evidence. Representatives for Sartorius denied that the account was Sartorius', pointing to the fact that Sartorius' official Facebook page was created on March 18, almost two months after aly said the messages were sent; BuzzFeed News described it as being a catfish account.

Discography

Awards and nominations

Tours 
 All My Friends Tour (2016)
 The Last Text World Tour (2017)
 The Left Me Hangin' Tour (2017)
 Night & Day Tour (opening act for The Vamps) (2018)

References

External links 
 
 

2002 births
Living people
21st-century American singers
21st-century American male singers
American adoptees
American child singers
American Internet celebrities
American TikTokers
Male bloggers
Musicians from Oklahoma
People from Reston, Virginia
People from Tulsa, Oklahoma
Singers from Virginia
Vine (service) celebrities